Dejan Mišković is the name of:
 Dejan Mišković (basketball) (born 1974), Serbian former basketball player.
 Dejan Mišković (footballer) (born 1985), Croatian football player.